Amirabad (also Romanized as Amīrābād) is a village in Sheykhdarabad Rural District, in the Central District of Meyaneh County, East Azerbaijan Province, Iran. At the 2006 census, its population was 38, in 8 families.

References 

Populated places in Meyaneh County